Macroscelidea is an order of small mammals. Members of this order are called macroscelids, or elephant shrews. They are exclusively found in Africa, in a variety of biomes from forests to deserts. They range in size from the Etendeka round-eared sengi, at  plus a  tail, to the grey-faced sengi, at  plus a  tail, and generally eat insects, other invertebrates, and plants. The only macroscelid species with an International Union for Conservation of Nature (IUCN) population estimate is the golden-rumped elephant shrew, listed as endangered with a population of around 13,000.

The nineteen extant species of Macroscelidea are grouped into a single family, Macroscelididae, and are split between six genera. Dozens of extinct macroscelid species have been discovered, though due to ongoing research and discoveries the exact number and categorization is not fixed.

Conventions

Conservation status codes listed follow the IUCN Red List of Threatened Species. Range maps are provided wherever possible; if a range map is not available, a description of the macroscelid's range is provided. Ranges are based on the IUCN Red List for that species unless otherwise noted. All extinct species or subspecies listed alongside extant species went extinct after 1500 CE, and are indicated by a dagger symbol "".

Classification
The order Macroscelidea consists of a single family, Macroscelididae, which contains twenty species divided into six genera. Many of these species are further subdivided into subspecies. This does not include hybrid species or extinct prehistoric species.

Family Macroscelididae
Genus Elephantulus (round-eared elephant shrews): eight species
Genus Galegeeska (Horn of Africa elephant shrews): two species
Genus Macroscelides (long-eared elephant shrews): three species
Genus Petrodromus (four-toed elephant shrew): one species
Genus Petrosaltator (North African elephant shrew): one species
Genus Rhynchocyon (checkered elephant shrews): four species

Macroscelids
The following classification is based on the taxonomy described by Mammal Species of the World (2005), with augmentation by generally accepted proposals made since using molecular phylogenetic analysis.

References

Sources

 
 

 
Macroscelids
Macroscelids